Frontier Investigator is a 1949 American Western film directed by Fred C. Brannon and written by Robert Creighton Williams. The film stars Allan Lane, Eddy Waller, Roy Barcroft, Gail Davis, Robert Emmett Keane and Clayton Moore. The film was released on May 2, 1949, by Republic Pictures.

Plot

Cast    
Allan Lane as Rocky Lane 
Black Jack as Black Jack
Eddy Waller as Nugget Clark
Roy Barcroft as Flint Fleming
Gail Davis as Janet Adams
Robert Emmett Keane as Erskine Doubleday
Clayton Moore as Scott Garnett
Francis Ford as Ed Garnett
Claire Whitney as Molly Bright
Harry Lauter as Rocky's Brother
Tom London as Jed
George Lloyd as Milton Leffingwell
Marshall Reed as Henchman

References

External links 
 

1949 films
American Western (genre) films
1949 Western (genre) films
Republic Pictures films
Films directed by Fred C. Brannon
American black-and-white films
1940s English-language films
1940s American films